The 1914 South Dakota Coyotes football team represented the University of South Dakota during the 1914 college football season. In Ion Cortright's first year as head coach, the Coyotes compiled a 5–2–1 record, and outscored their opponents 111 to 75. The Coyotes played a tough schedule, with regional powerhouses Nebraska, Notre Dame, and Minnesota. South Dakota did not manage to win any of these contests, but they did break a 14 game winning streak when they tied Nebraska 0–0 at Lincoln, and would become the Cornhuskers only blemish in a 34 game stretch from 1912 to 1916.

Schedule

References

South Dakota
South Dakota Coyotes football seasons
South Dakota Coyotes football